Salching is a municipality  in the district of Straubing-Bogen in Bavaria, Germany.

References

 

Straubing-Bogen